The WCT Challenge Cup was a men's tennis tournament held from 1976 until 1980 that was part of the World Championship Tennis circuit. It was played on outdoor hard courts in 1976, 1978 and indoor carpet courts in 1977 and 1979–80, The tournament was played in Honolulu, Hawaii in 1976, Las Vegas, Nevada in 1977, Montego Bay, Jamaica in 1978, and Montreal, Quebec, Canada from 1979–1980.  The tournament featured a field of four or eight players.

Finals

Singles

External links
 ATP results archive
 ITF search

Defunct tennis tournaments in the United States
World Championship Tennis
Recurring sporting events established in 1976
Recurring events disestablished in 1980
1976 establishments in Hawaii
1980 disestablishments in Canada